The Sporichthyaceae are the only family of the order Sporichthyales, which is a part of the phylum Actinomycetota.

References

Actinomycetota
Bacteria families